Clube Amigos do Basquete, also known as CAB Madeira, is a professional basketball team based in Funchal, Madeira, Portugal. They are comprised by men and women departments, both play in their respective highest Portuguese division.

Honours
According to information available in official sources.

Men
Portuguese Cup (1): 2010–11
Portuguese League Cup (1): 2004–05

Youth
U18 National Cup (2): 1999–2000, 2005–06

Women
Portuguese League (6): 1996–97, 1998–99, 2000–01, 2002–03, 2004–05, 2005–06
Portuguese Cup (7): 1995–96, 1998–99, 1999–2000, 2005–06, 2006–07, 2013–14, 2014–15
Portuguese League Cup (3): 2009–10, 2012–13, 2014–15
Vitor Hugo Cup (3): 2007–08, 2008–09, 2016–17
Portuguese Super Cup (7): 1995–96, 1996–97, 1999–2000, 2003–04, 2006–07, 2007–08, 2014–15

Youth
U16 Portuguese League (2): 2004–05, 2005–06
U14 Portuguese League (3): 2005–06, 2011–12, 2016–17
U19 National Cup (4): 1997–98, 1998–99, 2003–04, 2005–06
U16 National Cup (4): 1997–98, 2001–02, 2003–04, 2015–16

Notable players

  Milos Babic (2001–02)
  Branko Djipalo (2006–08)
  Nate Johnston (2003–04)
  Bobby Joe Hatton (2004–05)
  Walter Jeklin (2005–06)

References

External links
Official website 

Basketball teams in Portugal
Sport in Madeira